Éva Kiss (born 10 July 1987) is a retired Hungarian handball goalkeeper who most recently played for Győri ETO and the Hungarian national team.

She made her international debut on 22 September 2009 against Germany.

Achievements
Nemzeti Bajnokság I:
Winner: 2016, 2017, 2018, 2019
Silver Medallist: 2010, 2011
Bronze Medallist: 2009
Magyar Kupa:
Winner: 2016, 2018, 2019
Silver Medallist: 2009, 2011, 2017
EHF Champions League:
Winner: 2017, 2018, 2019
Silver Medalist: 2016
EHF Cup:
Semifinalist: 2006
European Championship:
Bronze Medalist: 2012

References

External links

1987 births
Living people
People from Nádudvar
Hungarian female handball players
Siófok KC players
Fehérvár KC players
Győri Audi ETO KC players
Sportspeople from Hajdú-Bihar County